Cunha is a Galician and Portuguese surname of toponymic origin. It may also refer to:

Cunha, São Paulo, city in Brazil.
Cunha (Braga), parish in Portugal.
Cunha (Paredes de Coura), parish in Portugal.
Cunha (Sernancelhe), parish in Portugal.
Rua do Cunha, street in Macau, China.
Tristan da Cunha, group of British islands in the south Atlantic Ocean.